Theodora Tzakri (14 September 1970 in Pella) is a Greek lawyer, politician, member of parliament and former deputy minister of Industry.

References

External links 
 Theodora Tzakri's CV in Eleftherotypia
 Theodora Tzakri's personal webpage 

1970 births
Living people
People from Pella
PASOK politicians
Greek MPs 2004–2007
Greek MPs 2007–2009
Greek MPs 2009–2012
Greek MPs 2012–2014
Greek MPs 2015 (February–August)
Greek MPs 2015–2019
Greek MPs 2019–2023
Greek women lawyers
20th-century Greek lawyers
Aristotle University of Thessaloniki alumni